Son Woo-hyeon, commonly known as Son Woo-hyun, (born Son Hyeon-seok on 30 November 1989) is a South Korean actor, singer and songwriter.

Son first appeared on television in 2011, as the leader of X-5 (a K-pop idol group) with the stage name "Ghun". Son quickly gathered public attention and gained popularity through his eye-catching performances along with the rise of Hallyu wave.

In the same year, Son achieved his acting debut when he was cast in the widely-acclaimed South Korean TV Series, Miss Ripley (2011). Having made his name, Son then appeared in a variety of different roles from numerous successful South Korean films and television series. Some of his most notable works include Spy Myung-wol (2011), Live (2018), The Nokdu Flower (2019), Touch (2020), Mouse (2021), and The Golden Spoon (2022).

Early life and education 
Son Woo-hyeon was born with the name Son Hyeon-seok on 30 November 1989 in the Seo district of the fifth largest city in South Korea, Daejeon. Being raised in a family of four, Son is the youngest child in the family. Son received elementary education at Seowon Elementary School in Deajeon. After gradaution, Son went to Daejeon Samcheon Middle School and Chungnam High School for his secondary education. Son successfully enrolled into Kookmin University, studying at the Department of Theater and Film, Faculty of Performing Arts and earned his Bachelor's degree.

Career

2009–2011: Beginnings and Three Musketeers 

In 2009, Son debut as a member in a trio band called the Three Musketeers under the record label of Open World Entertainment. During the promotion period, Son used the stage name of "Hwarang". In early March 2010, the band made a comeback with a change of concept as a nursery rhyme dance group and the title song of "Eat Eat" (Hangul: "먹어 먹어"). The title track became an instant hit and is widely used in reality shows as background music whenever there are scenes involving the performers eating on-air, notably in Up To The King. Recently it has become the representative background music of Delicious Guys.

2011–2012: The days as X-5 
With the Open World Entertainment's decision to merge and rebrand the trio band, Son debuted as the leader of a K-pop idol group, X-5, under the stage name as "Ghun" on 19 April 2011. Following their successful debut, X-5 gained significant attention and was popularly known as 'Tall Idols'. At the time, they also received a lot of support and publicity as the 'sibling-group' of The Boss, a boy band from the same agency.

On 22 April 2011, the single Xenos was released and the title song "Shohajima" featured. During the premier stage, X-5 left a strong impression with the audience as they performed and danced while wearing sunglasses. Six months later, on 9 December 2011, they released a mini-album Dangerous, featuring the title track of the same name.

In May 2012, Son made his acting debut when X-5 is cast in the critically-acclaimed television series, Miss Ripley (2011). As a 2011 commercial success, it attracted publicity for, and attention to, the group. In the following month, Son was again cast in another television series, Spy Myung-wol (2011). Produced and aired by Korean Broadcasting System (KBS), one of the three leading television broadcasters in South Korea, the series achieved a viewership rating of more than 10 in its premier run.

On 13 April 2012, a little under a year after the official debut, X-5 was forced to cancel all planned public appearances with future activities put on hold after a scandal surrounding the CEO of Open World Entertainment unfolded. Following the arrest of the CEO in December 2012, X-5 officially disbanded and Son ended his contract with Open World Entertainment, leaving the agency shortly thereafter.

2013–2014: Military enlistment and hiatus 
On 4 December 2012, to not cause any disruptions, Son quietly enlisted into the Republic of Korea Armed Forces to serve his mandatory military service. During the conscription, Son served as a sergeant in the Air Force Flight 722 of Republic of Korea Air Force. He was discharged from service in late 2014.

2015–2018: Comeback and silver screen debut 

Following his discharge from the military, Son focused his career direction on acting and has since taken on various roles on silver screen and television projects. Starting in 2015, Son received multiple high-level endorsements from some, if not the largest Fortune 500 global brands like Apple, Samsung, LG, Kia and Nivea for the roles he plays during the product launches and advertisements. On top of that, Son also played a leading role in a South Korean government campaign, X-project, managed and run by the Ministry of Science, ICT and Future Planning.

In 2016, Son had his comeback on television series since his enlistment into the military. He was cast in Blow Breeze (2016), a romance comedy South Korean drama about a North Korean girl who is interested in dancing and who defects to South Korea where she meets a lawyer who will be her lover for life. The series gathered an average nationwide viewership rating 15 for its runs of 50 episodes on MBC between August 27, 2016 to February 26, 2017. 

Later in 2016, Son played a leading role in a short film, Butterfly Effect (2016) as he transitioned from television series to the silver screen.

In 2017, Son has his first silver screen debut when he is offered a supporting role in Excavator (2017), a war film that follows a paratrooper through series of events during the May 18, 1980 Gwangju Uprising also known as the "May 18 Gwangju Democratization Movement". In the same year, Son received a leading role offer in an office-romance Web-series titled Love Intern Choi Woo Sung (2017) where he played an office intern who finally realises the cold-hard reality of modern society. Son took up a role in another 2017 Web-series, No Bad Days (2017) that told the story of a woman in her twenties who is trying to find a balance between work, love, and relationships.

2018 marked a smooth sailing year for Son as he continued to rise in the acting industry with Live (2018) taking precedence. Directed by Kim Kyu-tae and starring the hallyu star, Lee Kwang-soo, Live (2018) gathered much needed attention thanks to its release on both Netflix and cable television. Son's role as a patrol police officer in the series put him under spotlight when viewers are fond of his police-uniformed appearance. A few months later, Son appeared in Just Dance (2018), a life and sport genre television series based on documentary of the same name. It tells a story of a group of student at Geoje Girl’s Vocational High School with different dreams, trying all out to be better dancers despite their struggles in life. About the same period, Son also resumes his original role in No Bad Days 2 (2018) as sequel to the 2017 Web-series, No Bad Days, he was previously cast in.

2019–2020:  Rising popularity and mainstream success 
Starting from 2019, Son sees an elevation in his career in terms of public attention and role offerings resulting from his higher level of participation in mainstream television series produced and aired by leading South Korean broadcaster, notably the MBC, SBS and TvN. This is backed by the fact that television series made under the branding of leading broadcasters are often able to top the chart and dominate the Nationwide viewership ranking for their ability to gather significant publicity and interests from Hallyu audiences around the world. Marking the start is Nokdu Flower, a SBS's 2019 historical television series that focuses on the true events of Donghak Peasant Revolution and the Battle of Ugeumchi which took place in 1894. In the series, Son portrays the role of a righteous, sympathetic Commander of Joseon Imperial guard who feels deeply for the uprising peasants and is willing to assist them in achieving their good cause despite the opposite stance he is in. During its premier run, Nokdu Flower achieved a steady rating of 13.2 in Seoul metropolitan area alone and 11.5 nationwide.

The same year, Son was cast in TvN's Drama Stage Season 3 (2019) in the chapter of "Woman with a Bleeding Ear", playing the role of the boyfriend to a woman named Kim Soo Hee. Shortly thereafter, Son starred in a YouTube exclusive Web-series, About Youth (2019) which tells an inspiring story of four youths trying to achieve dreams in their own ways while fighting social and cultural stigmas. With Son's silver screen casting, he took up a supporting role in Crazy Romance (2019), the first commercial film directed by Kim Han Gyeol which also marks 16 years since Kim Rae-won and Gong Hyo-jin last collaborated in the classic Korean drama Snowman.

In 2020, Son starred in youth action film Justice High (2020) directed by Chae Yeo-jun.

2021–present: Breakthrough and continued success 
In 2021, Son signed an exclusive contract with King Kong by Starship a subsidiary of Starship Entertainment, which is often seen as a major player and a driving force behind the K-pop industry.

Personal life

Military enlistment 
On 4 December 2012, Son enlisted into the Republic of Korea Armed Forces to serve his mandatory military service. During the conscription, Son served as a sergeant in the Air Force Flight 722 of Republic of Korea Air Force. He was discharged from service on 4 December 2014.

Filmography

Film

Television series

Web series

Music video

Discography

Studio albums

Songs

Songwriting credits 
All credits are adapted from the Korea Music Copyright Association, unless stated otherwise.

Notes

References

External links 

 
 
 

South Korean male film actors
South Korean male musical theatre actors
South Korean male television actors
South Korean male web series actors
South Korean male dancers
South Korean male idols
South Korean male singers
South Korean male pop singers
South Korean male singer-songwriters
South Korean singer-songwriters
South Korean television presenters
Kookmin University alumni
Living people
People from Daejeon
1989 births
21st-century South Korean singers
21st-century South Korean male actors